Niklaus Pfluger, SSPX (born 3 November 1958), is a Catholic priest and First Assistant of the Traditional Catholic Society of St. Pius X.

Early life and priesthood
Pfluger was born in Oensingen, in the  canton of Solothurn, Switzerland, November 3, 1958. He was ordained a priest July 1, 1984, at Zaitzkofen (Bavaria, Germany) by Archbishop Marcel Lefebvre. In 1989, after 5 years of apostolate at Oberriet, Switzerland, then at Basel, he was named District Superior of the Society of St. Pius X in Switzerland. In 1991, he became the Rector of the Society of St. Pius X Seminary in Zaitzkofen, Germany. In 1998, he returned to Switzerland once again as District Superior of the Society of St. Pius X in that country.  In 2004, he was named District Superior for the Society of St. Pius X in Germany.  In 2006, at the General Chapter of the Society of St. Pius X, he was elected First Assistant  to Bishop Bernard Fellay the Superior General.  First Assistant to the Superior General is the second most important position in the Society of St. Pius X.  As a member of the General Council with Bishop Fellay and the Second Assistant, Father Alain Nelly, he takes part in deliberations concerning the most important questions of the Society of St. Pius X.

References

External links

  English information on the Society of St. Pius X of which Father Pfluger is the First Assistant.
  Priesterbruderschaft St. Pius X: District of Switzerland of which Father Pfluger was the superior for several years.
  Priesterbruderschaft St. Pius X: District of Germany of which Father Pfluger was the made superior in 2004.

20th-century Swiss Roman Catholic priests
1958 births
Living people
People from the canton of Solothurn
Swiss traditionalist Catholics
Members of the Society of Saint Pius X
21st-century Swiss Roman Catholic priests